Ludvig Peter Fenger (7 July 1833 – 9 March 1905) was a Danish architect. He was a proponent of the Historicist style, and from 1886 to 1904 he held the title of City Architect in Copenhagen.

Among his works are several churches, the Central Fire Station and Vestre Prison in Copenhagen. He also directed the renovations of Church of Holmen and Christian IV's Stock Exchange.

Early life and education
Ludvig Fenger was born on 7 July 1833 in the village of Slots Bjergby outside Slagelse as the son of the local pastor. After graduating from Slagelse Latin School he attended the Royal Danish Academy while also working for architects such as Michael Gottlieb Bindesbøll, Christian Hansen and Ferdinand Meldahl. He received the Academy's Large Gold Medal in 1866 and went on several journeys abroad from 1867 to 1869. He participated in the Second Schleswig War against Germany, was wounded and became a prisoner of war.

Career
In 1871 Fenger became a member of the Academy and in 1880 he was made a professor. From 1886 he was a corresponding member of the Royal Institute of British Architects.

In 1885 he entered local politics when he became a member of the Copenhagen City Council in Copenhagen, a post he left when he was appointed City Architect the following year.

Personal life
Fenger married on 3 July 1872 in the Church of Our Saviour Augusta Theodora Fenger (1839-1914), daughter of vicar Johannes Ferdinand Fenger (1805-61) and Marie Magdalene Boesen (1809-72).

He was created a Knight in the Order of the Dannebrog in 1890 and was awarded the Cross of Honour in 1897. He died on 9 March 1905 and is buried in Copenhagen's Western Cemetery.

Selected works
 Laboratory building, Lund University, Lund, Sweden (1860)
 Royal Mint, Copenhagen (1873, with Ferdinand Meldahl)
  Rynkevang Manor, Kalundborg (1874)
 Frederik VII's Tower, Himmelbjerget (1875)
 Tiselholt Manor, Svendborg (1874–1876)
 St. James' Church, Østerbro, Copenhagen (1876–1878)
 St. Matthew's Church, Vesterbro, Copenhagen (1878–1880)
 Stege Sugar Factory, Stege (1883–1885)
 St. Alban's Church, Copenhagen (1885–1887, to the design of Arthur Blomfield)
 Copenhagen Central Fire Station, Copenhagen (1889–1892)
 Vestre Prison, Copenhagen (1892–1895)
 Western Power Station, Copenhagen(1896–1898)
 Øksnehallen, the Copenhagen Meatpacking District, Copenhagen (1901)
 Holmens Cemetery Chapel, Holmens Cemetery, Copenhagen (1902)

Writings

Gallery

See also

 Architecture of Denmark
 Source

References

19th-century Danish architects
19th-century Copenhagen City Council members
Historicist architects
1833 births
1905 deaths
Knights of the Order of the Dannebrog
People from Slagelse Municipality
Burials at Vestre Cemetery, Copenhagen